Leucopogon florulentus is a species of flowering plant in the heath family Ericaceae and is endemic to the south-west of Western Australia.

The species was first formally described in 1868 by George Bentham in Flora Australiensis from specimens collected between King George Sound and the Swan River Colony.
The specific epithet (florulentus) means "an abundance of flowers".

Leucopogon florulentus is listed as  "Priority Three" by the Government of Western Australia Department of Biodiversity, Conservation and Attractions, meaning that it is poorly known and known from only a few locations but is not under imminent threat.

References

florulentus
Ericales of Australia
Flora of Western Australia
Plants described in 1868
Taxa named by George Bentham